Dinehvar (also Romanized as Dīnehvar; also known as Dīnavar, Dinovar, and Dīnvar) is a village in Dizmar-e Sharqi Rural District, Minjavan District, Khoda Afarin County, East Azerbaijan Province, Iran. At the 2006 census, its population was 81, in 22 families.

References 

Populated places in Khoda Afarin County